Kodžadžik, is a village in the municipality of Centar Župa, North Macedonia. The village is inhabited mainly by Turks.

Name 
A former Ottoman fortress existed at the location of Kodžadžik before the end of the first half of the 15th century. Scholars such as Smiljanić and Hadži Vasiljević stated that a battle between Skanderbeg and the Ottoman Turks took place in the area, and that the name of the village derives from the Ottoman Turkish expression kocacenk, which means big battle.

History 
According to historians, the village was first mentioned in 1385 and the name of the village means Great Battle. It was known as Sfetigrad before the Ottoman conquest in 1448, in which Ottoman forces captured it from forces of the League of Lezhë after sieging it for three months. After the Ottoman conquest, Kodžadžik was settled by Ottoman soldiers and Turkish nomads (Yörüks). The local church was converted to an Ottoman mosque, and Kodžadžik, as part of the sanjak (district) Debra-i Bala, became a center that connected the southeast with Albania and the Adriatic Sea. In the course of time, resettlements of the Turks to nearby villages, intermarriages, and social interactions contributed to Turkification of the area and Islamization through religious conversion. 

The fortress of Kodžadžik is recorded in the Ottoman defter of 1467 with 51 household heads being attested who were exempt from paying the haraç tax as long as they maintained the upper fortress. The personal names recorded are of a mixed local Albanian-Slavic (and more generally Christian) character, although the Slavic onomastic element predominates; Radeko Porteviri; Pejo (possibly, Pijo), son of Radeko; Todor Koleci; Bogçeja son of Todor; Nikolla son of Drago; Todor Drago; Jançe, brother of Todor; Radako, brother of Jançe; Dimitri Pavli; Ivan Koleci; Nikolla son of Tanas; Gjorgje Pavli; Dimitri Koleci; Pavël Kallogjeri; Gjoni, son of Pavël; Pop Bojko; Nikolla brother of Pop Bojko; Gjon Strumahu; Petër Kalani; Radec Deskoviçi; Petko Shirgji; Todori, brother of Petko; Radçe Bogisha; Dimitri Zaharia; Ifço Bogiçi; Bogiçe, son of Ifço; Gjon Llazari; Vlashi, brother of Gjon; Nikolla Bratani; Gjorgo Strumahu; Gjergj Koleci; Nanko, brother of Gjergj; Pjeko Obertko (Obretko); Nenko, brother of Pjeko; Todori, brother of Nenko; Gjuro Kozhonari; Ninec Damziqi; Brato, brother of Ninec; Pjero Llazini; Pop Ratko; Radqe Stanisha; Zaharia Stanisha; Ninec Vidiqi; Radçe Kozhari; Dabërto Strumahu; Dako Masktori; Bushko Todori; and Ninec Dajçi.

The carpenters of the upper castle, who were also exempt from taxes, were: Gjin Drodgjeri; Bogiçe, son of Gjin; and Aleko, son of Gjin.      

Kodžadžik is known for the house of Mustafa Kemal Atatürk's parents. The memorial house of Kemal Atatürk's father was reconstructed in Kodžadžik.

Demographics 
The village is inhabited by a Turkish speaking population consisting of Turks.

As of the 2021 census, Kodžadžik had 146 residents with the following ethnic composition:
Turks 141
Persons for whom data are taken from administrative sources 5

According to the 2002 census, the village had a total of 275 inhabitants, whom all are Turks.

References 

Villages in Centar Župa Municipality
Turkish communities in North Macedonia